

QI07A Dog

QI07AA Inactivated viral vaccines
QI07AA01 Canine parvovirus
QI07AA02 Rabies virus
QI07AA03 Canine parainfluenza virus + canine reovirus + canine influenza virus
QI07AA04 Canine parainfluenza virus
QI07AA05 Canine adenovirus
QI07AA06 Canine herpesvirus
QI07AA07 Canine influenza virus

QI07AB Inactivated bacterial vaccines (including mycoplasma, toxoid and chlamydia)
QI07AB01 Leptospira
QI07AB02 Staphylococcus
QI07AB03 Bordetella
QI07AB04 Borrelia

QI07AC Inactivated bacterial vaccines and antisera
Empty group

QI07AD Live viral vaccines
QI07AD01 Canine parvovirus
QI07AD02 Canine distemper virus + canine adenovirus + canine parvovirus
QI07AD03 Canine distemper virus + canine parvovirus
QI07AD04 Canine distemper virus + canine adenovirus + canine parvovirus + canine parainfluenza virus
QI07AD05 Canine distemper virus
QI07AD06 Canine distemper virus + canine adenovirus
QI07AD07 Canine distemper virus + canine parainfluenza virus
QI07AD08 Canine parainfluenza virus
QI07AD09 Canine parvovirus + canine parainfluenza virus
QI07AD10 Canine distemper virus + canine adenovirus + canine parainfluenza virus
QI07AD11 Canine coronavirus
QI07AD12 Canine coronavirus + canine parvovirus
QI07AD13 Canine parapox virus
QI07AD14 Canine distemper virus based on measles virus

QI07AE Live bacterial vaccines
QI07AE01 Bordetella

QI07AF Live bacterial and viral vaccines
QI07AF01 Bordetella + canine parainfluenza virus
QI07AF02 Bordetella + canine adenovirus + canine parainfluenza virus

QI07AG Live and inactivated bacterial vaccines
Empty group

QI07AH Live and inactivated viral vaccines
QI07AH01 Live canine distemper virus + inactivated canine adenovirus + inactivated canine parvovirus
QI07AH02 Live canine parainfluenza virus + inactivated canine parvovirus
QI07AH03 Live canine distemper virus + live canine parainfluenza virus + inactivated canine adenovirus + inactivated canine parvovirus
QI07AH04 Live canine distemper virus + live canine parvovirus + inactivated canine coronavirus
QI07AH05 Live canine distemper virus + live canine adenovirus + live canine parvovirus + live canine parainfluenza virus + inactivated feline coronavirus
QI07AH06 Live canine parainfluenza virus + inactivated feline coronavirus

QI07AI Live viral and inactivated bacterial vaccines
QI07AI01 Live canine distemper virus + live canine adenovirus + inactivated leptospira
QI07AI02 Live canine distemper virus + live canine adenovirus + live canine parainfluenza virus + live canine parvovirus + inactivated leptospira
QI07AI03 Live canine distemper virus + live canine adenovirus + live canine parvovirus + inactivated leptospira
QI07AI04 Live canine distemper virus + inactivated leptospira
QI07AI05 Live canine parvovirus + inactivated leptospira
QI07AI06 Live canine distemper virus + live canine parvovirus + inactivated leptospira
QI07AI07 Live canine parvovirus + live canine parainfluenza virus + inactivated leptospira
QI07AI08 Live canine parainfluenza virus + inactivated leptospira

QI07AJ Live and inactivated viral and bacterial vaccines
QI07AJ01 Live canine distemper virus + inactivated canine adenovirus + inactivated rabies + inactivated leptospira
QI07AJ02 Live canine distemper virus + inactivated canine adenovirus + inactivated leptospira
QI07AJ03 Live canine distemper virus + inactivated canine adenovirus + inactivated canine parvovirus + inactivated leptospira
QI07AJ04 Live canine distemper virus + inactivated canine adenovirus + inactivated canine parvovirus + inactivated rabies + inactivated leptospira
QI07AJ05 Live canine distemper virus + live canine adenovirus + live canine parvovirus + inactivated rabies + inactivated leptospira
QI07AJ06 Live canine distemper virus + live canine adenovirus + live parainfluenza virus + live canine parvovirus + inactivated rabies + inactivated leptospira
QI07AJ07 Live canine distemper virus + live canine adenovirus + inactivated rabies + inactivated leptospira
QI07AJ08 Live canine distemper virus + live canine adenovirus + inactivated canine parvovirus + inactivated leptospira
QI07AJ09 Live canine distemper virus + live canine adenovirus + live canine parvovirus + inactivated leptospira
QI07AJ10 Live canine distemper virus + live canine adenovirus + live parainfluenza virus + live canine parvovirus + inactivated canine coronavirus + inactivated leptospira
QI07AJ11 Live canine parvovirus + live canine parainfluenza virus + inactivated leptospira + inactivated canine coronavirus
QI07AJ12 Live canine parainfluenza virus + inactivated leptospira + inactivated canine coronavirus

QI07AK Inactivated viral and live bacterial vaccines
Empty group

QI07AL Inactivated viral and inactivated bacterial vaccines
QI07AL01 Rabies virus + leptospira
QI07AL02 Rabies virus + canine parvovirus + leptospira
QI07AL03 Canine distemper virus + canine adenovirus + canine parvovirus + rabies virus + leptospira
QI07AL04 Canine parvovirus + leptospira
QI07AL05 Bordetella + canine parainfluenza virus

QI07AM Antisera, immunoglobulin preparations, and antitoxins
QI07AM01 Canine distemper antiserum + canine adenovirus antiserum + canine parvovirus antiserum + leptospira antiserum
QI07AM02 Anti lipopolysacharide antiserum
QI07AM03 Canine distemper antiserum + canine adenovirus antiserum + canine parvovirus antiserum

QI07AN Live parasitic vaccines
Empty group

QI07AO Inactivated parasitic vaccines
QI07AO01 Leishmania

QI07AP Live fungal vaccines
Empty group

QI07AQ Inactivated fungal vaccines
QI07AQ01 Trichophyton + microsporum
QI07AQ02 Microsporum vaccine

QI07AR In vivo diagnostic preparations
Empty group

QI07AS Allergens
Empty group

QI07AT Colostrum preparations and substitutes
Empty group

QI07AU Other live vaccines
Empty group

QI07AV Other inactivated vaccines
QI07AV01 Staphylococcus + bacteriophage

QI07AX Other immunologicals
Empty group

QI07B Fox

QI07BA Inactivated viral vaccines
Empty group

QI07BB Inactivated bacterial vaccines (including mycoplasma, toxoid and chlamydia)
Empty group

QI07BC Inactivated bacterial vaccines and antisera
Empty group

QI07BD Live viral vaccines
Empty group

QI07BE Live bacterial vaccines
Empty group

QI07BF Live bacterial and viral vaccines
Empty group

QI07BG Live and inactivated bacterial vaccines
Empty group

QI07BH Live and inactivated viral vaccines
Empty group

QI07BI Live viral and inactivated bacterial vaccines
Empty group

QI07BJ Live and inactivated viral and bacterial vaccines
Empty group

QI07BK Inactivated viral and live bacterial vaccines
Empty group

QI07BL Inactivated viral and inactivated bacterial vaccines
Empty group

QI07BM Antisera, immunoglobulin preparations, and antitoxins
Empty group

QI07BN Live parasitic vaccines
Empty group

QI07BO Inactivated parasitic vaccines
Empty group

QI07BP Live fungal vaccines
Empty group

QI07BQ Inactivated fungal vaccines
Empty group

QI07BR In vivo diagnostic preparations
Empty group

QI07BS Allergens
Empty group

QI07BT Colostrum preparations and substitutes
Empty group

QI07BU Other live vaccines
Empty group

QI07BV Other inactivated vaccines
Empty group

QI07BX Other immunologicals
Empty group

QI07X Canidae, others

QI07XA Inactivated viral vaccines
Empty group

QI07XB Inactivated bacterial vaccines (including mycoplasma, toxoid and chlamydia)
Empty group

QI07XC Inactivated bacterial vaccines and antisera
Empty group

QI07XD Live viral vaccines
Empty group

QI07XE Live bacterial vaccines
Empty group

QI07XF Live bacterial and viral vaccines
Empty group

QI07XG Live and inactivated bacterial vaccines
Empty group

QI07XH Live and inactivated viral vaccines
Empty group

QI07XI Live viral and inactivated bacterial vaccines
Empty group

QI07XJ Live and inactivated viral and bacterial vaccines
Empty group

QI07XK Inactivated viral and live bacterial vaccines
Empty group

QI07XL Inactivated viral and inactivated bacterial vaccines
Empty group

QI07XM Antisera, immunoglobulin preparations, and antitoxins
Empty group

QI07XN Live parasitic vaccines
Empty group

QI07XO Inactivated parasitic vaccines
Empty group

QI07XP Live fungal vaccines
Empty group

QI07XQ Inactivated fungal vaccines
Empty group

QI07XR In vivo diagnostic preparations
Empty group

QI07XS Allergens
Empty group

QI07XT Colostrum preparations and substitutes
Empty group

QI07XU Other live vaccines
Empty group

QI07XV Other inactivated vaccines
Empty group

QI07XX Other immunologicals
Empty group

See also
 Vaccination of dogs

References

I07